Sabun may refer to:
Abd al-Karim Sabun, Sultan of Wadai from 1804 to 1815
Kampong Sabun, a village in Brunei
Sabun (river), a river in the Khanty-Mansi Autonomous Okrug of Russia
Sabun, Somalia, a town in the Middle Shabelle region of Somalia